The discography of Guns N' Roses, an American hard rock band, consists of six studio albums, one live album, two compilation albums, four extended plays (EPs), 20 singles, nine video albums and 23 music videos. Guns N' Roses was formed in Los Angeles, California with an original recording lineup of lead vocalist Axl Rose, lead guitarist Slash, rhythm guitarist Izzy Stradlin, bassist Duff McKagan and drummer Steven Adler. After self-releasing the EP Live ?!*@ Like a Suicide in December 1986, the band signed with Geffen Records and released its debut studio album Appetite for Destruction the following July. It topped the US Billboard 200 and went on to become one of the best-selling albums of all time, with reported sales over 30 million units worldwide, 18 million of which are in the US. Three singles – "Welcome to the Jungle", "Sweet Child o' Mine" and "Paradise City" – reached the US Billboard Hot 100 top ten, with "Sweet Child o' Mine" topping the chart.

G N' R Lies followed in November 1988, comprising the four tracks from Live ?!*@ Like a Suicide and four new acoustic recordings. The album peaked at number 2 in the US and was certified six times platinum, while its lead single "Patience" reached number 4 on the singles chart. After adding keyboardist Dizzy Reed and replacing Adler with Matt Sorum, Guns N' Roses released Use Your Illusion I and Use Your Illusion II in September 1991. Upon their release, the albums occupied the top two positions on the US Billboard Top 200 Album chart. Use Your Illusion II reached number 1, which Axl Rose credited to fans knowing more of the songs from II due to live performances. "November Rain" was the most successful single from the albums domestically, reaching number 3 on the Hot 100.

During the Use Your Illusion Tour, Stradlin was replaced by Gilby Clarke. In 1992 the band released two live videos from the tour, Use Your Illusion World Tour: 1992 in Tokyo I and II, which both reached the top 20 of the Billboard Music Video Sales chart and were certified gold. The following November saw the release of "The Spaghetti Incident?", an album of punk rock cover versions. The album garnered no US hit singles, but reached number 4 on the US album chart. Two singles – "Ain't It Fun" and "Since I Don't Have You" – reached the top ten of the UK Singles Chart. Clarke was replaced by Rose's friend Paul Tobias for a recording of "Sympathy for the Devil" for the Interview with the Vampire soundtrack in 1994, which charted at number 55 in the US and number 9 in the UK.

Guns N' Roses changed drastically in the mid-1990s, as Slash left in 1996, and Sorum and McKagan left in 1997. The band went through numerous lineup changes as it worked on its new album in 1997 with Rose, Reed, and Tobias the only remaining members from the previous lineup, and Rose himself the only member from the first album's release in 1987. The group's first live album Live Era '87–'93 was issued in 1999, and reached number 45 on the US Billboard Top 200 Album chart. In 2004, Geffen Records released a Greatest Hits album. It was a commercial success that topped the album charts in several countries, including the UK, and sold 5 million copies in the US. The band's sixth studio album Chinese Democracy was released in November 2008, after 10 years in the making and over $13 million in production costs. It reached number 3 on the US Billboard Top 200 Album chart, and sold roughly 2.5 million copies worldwide. Appetite for Democracy 3D, the first Guns N' Roses live video album since 1992, was released in 2014 and reached number 1 on the US Billboard Music Video Sales chart. Slash and McKagan rejoined the band in 2016, and in 2018, the band released a remastered box set of their debut album, titled the Appetite for Destruction: Locked N' Loaded edition.

Slash and McKagan's first recordings since rejoining the band, the singles "Absurd" & "Hard Skool", were released in 2021, the band's first new material released since 2008. On September 21, 2022, the band announced a remastered box set of the Use Your Illusion albums, featuring both albums remastered, two complete live performances, and a version of "November Rain" with re-recorded orchestration. The set is due to be released on November 11, 2022.

Albums

Studio albums

Live albums

Compilation albums

Extended plays

Studio EPs

Compilation EPs

Box sets

Singles

Promotional singles
 "Mr. Brownstone" (1988) UK only
 "14 Years" (1991)
 "Pretty Tied Up" (1992) – US Mainstream Rock #35
 "So Fine" (1992)
 "Garden of Eden" (1992)
 "Dead Horse" (1993)
 "Hair of the Dog" (1993) – US Mainstream Rock #11
 "New Rose" (1993)
 "Oh My God" (1999) – US Mainstream Rock #26
 "Better" (2008) – US Mainstream Rock #18, Canadian Active Rock #15, Canadian Rock #37
 "Street of Dreams" (2009) - Canadian Active Rock #44
 "Welcome to the Jungle (1986 Sound City Session)" (2018)
 "Move to the City (1988 Acoustic Version)" (2018)
 "November Rain (Piano Version / 1986 Sound City Session)" (2018)
 "You Could Be Mine (Live in New York, Ritz Theatre - May 16, 1991)" (2022)
 "Double Talkin' Jive (Live In Las Vegas, Thomas & Mack Center - January 25, 1992)" (2022)
 "November Rain (2022 version)" (2022)

Other charted songs
 "I.R.S." (leaked demo) – #49, Radio & Records Active Rock National Airplay (US) for week ending February 24, 2006.

Videos

Video albums

Music videos

Notes

References

External links

Discography
Guns N' Roses
Guns N' Roses